Attica Blues is an album by avant-garde jazz saxophonist Archie Shepp. Originally released in 1972 on the Impulse! label, the album title refers to the Attica Prison riots.

Reception
The AllMusic review by Steve Huey states: "Attica Blues is one of Shepp's most successful large-group projects, because his skillful handling of so many different styles of black music produces such tremendously groovy results". Stephen Davis of Rolling Stone said that it was "not just a masterpiece of protest: [...] it is more a politico/religious experience, an appeal to higher human consciousness to, for God's sake, help us out of this torment."

Track listing 
All compositions by Archie Shepp, except as indicated
 "Attica Blues" (lyrics by Beaver Harris) – 4:49
 "Invocation: Attica Blues" (Harris) – 0:18
 "Steam, Part 1" – 5:08
 "Invocation to Mr. Parker" (lyrics by Bart Gray) – 3:17
 "Steam, Part 2" – 5:10
 "Blues for Brother George Jackson" – 4:00
 "Invocation: Ballad for a Child" (Harris) – 0:30
 "Ballad for a Child" (lyrics by Harris) – 3:37
 "Good-Bye Sweet Pops" (Cal Massey) – 4:23
 "Quiet Dawn" (Massey) – 6:12
Recorded at A&R Recording, NYC, January 24–26, 1972 (Track timings slightly differ from one issue to another, due to merging tracks.)

Personnel 
 Archie Shepp - tenor saxophone (1, 6, 8, 10) and soprano saxophone (3, 5, 9)
Brass and reed section on tracks 1, 6, 9 and 10
 Clifford Thornton - cornet
 Roy Burrows, Charles McGhee, Michael Ridley - trumpet
 Charles Greenlee, Charles Stephens, Kiane Zawadi - trombone
 Hakim Jami - euphonium
 Clarence White - alto saxophone
 Roland Alexander, Billy Robinson - tenor saxophone
 James Ware - baritone saxophone
String section on tracks 1, 3, 5, and 8—10
 John Blake, Leroy Jenkins, Lakshinarayana Shankar - violin
 Ronald Lipscomb, Calo Scott - cello
 Marion Brown - alto saxophone (1, 6), bamboo flute (3), flute (4), percussion (3—5)
 Walter Davis, Jr. - electric piano (1, 6), piano (6, 8—10)
 Dave Burrell - electric piano (3, 5)
 Cornell Dupree - guitar (1, 3, 5, 8)
 Roland Wilson (1, 3, 5–6, 8), Gerald Jemmott (1) - Fender bass
 Jimmy Garrison - bass (3—5, 9, 10)
 Beaver Harris (1, 3, 5–6, 8) - drums
 Ollie Anderson, Nene DeFense, Juma Sultan - percussion (1, 6, 10)
Vocals
 Henry Hull (1, 8), Joe Lee Wilson (3, 5) - vocals
 William Kunstler (2, 7), Bartholomew Gray (4) - narrator
 Joshie Armstead, Albertine Robertson - backing vocals (1)
Featured exclusively on tracks 9 and 10, written by Cal Massey
 Romulus Franceschini - conductor and co-arranger
 Cal Massey - fluegelhorn (10)
 Waheeda Massey - vocals (10)
 Billy Higgins - drums

References

External links
 BBC Music Review, Attica Blues
 Allmusic Review, Attica Blues

1972 albums
Impulse! Records albums
Archie Shepp albums
Political music albums by American artists
Attica Correctional Facility